Lydia Nsekera (born 20 April 1967) is a Burundian sports official who has been a member of the International Olympic Committee since 2009.

Career

Football Administration 
Nsekera was president of the Football Federation of Burundi between 2004 and 2013. In 2012 she was the first woman to be co-opted onto the FIFA Council for one year and in 2013 gained election for a full four-year term, also the first woman to achieve this.

She served through till 2021, when she lost her bid to represent Africa on the council for the third time after serving on the council for 8 years. She lost to her successor Isha Johansen on 12 March 2021 during the CAF General Assembly.

Olympics Committee 
She is the president of the Burundi National Olympic Committee (NOC Burundi). She has twice vied for the Association of National Olympic Committees of Africa (ANOCA) but lost on both occasions to Mustapha Berraf. She made it as a point of duty to restore the image of ANOCA when she selected to lead them.

She currently chairs the IOC Women in Sport Commission. She serves on the Tokyo 2020 and Los Angeles 2028 Coordination Commissions.

References

External links
IOC member profile

1967 births
Football in Burundi
International Olympic Committee members
Living people
Women association football executives
FIFA officials
Women FIFA officials